Jeremiah Bailey (May 1, 1773 – July 6, 1853) was a United States representative from Maine.  He was born in Little Compton, Rhode Island on May 1, 1773.  He attended the common schools and graduated from Brown University in 1794.  He studied law, was admitted to the bar and commenced practice in Wiscasset, Maine (until 1820 a district of Massachusetts).

He was a presidential elector on the Federalist ticket in 1808. He was a member of the general court 1811–1814; judge of probate 1816–1834; elected as an Anti-Jacksonian to the Twenty-fourth Congress (March 4, 1835 – March 3, 1837). He was an unsuccessful candidate for reelection in 1836 to the Twenty-fifth Congress.

As a member of the Whig Party, he was appointed collector of customs of Wiscasset 1849–1853, and died there July 6, 1853.  His interment was in Evergreen Cemetery.

References

1773 births
1853 deaths
People from Little Compton, Rhode Island
Massachusetts Federalists
Maine Whigs
Brown University alumni
People from Wiscasset, Maine
National Republican Party members of the United States House of Representatives from Maine
People of colonial Rhode Island